Ways to Live Forever is a 2010 drama film by director Gustavo Ron based on the award-winning 2008 novel of the same name written by Sally Nicholls.  The film stars Robbie Kay, Alex Etel, Ben Chaplin, Emilia Fox, and Greta Scacchi. The film is produced by Life&Soul Productions, El Capitan Pictures, and Formato Producciones. It was distributed via Karma in Spain, World Wide Motion Pictures Corporation for North America, and InTandem for the rest of the world.

Cast 
Robbie Kay as Sam: A 12-year-old boy who likes to know facts. He is dying of leukemia.  He has a list of things he wants to do before he dies. The book Ways to Live Forever is presented as the book he is writing.
Alex Etel as Felix: Sam's friend who has cancer. He has a wheelchair, and is straightforward.
Ben Chaplin as Daniel: Sam's father, a quiet man.
Emilia Fox as Amanda: Sam's mother.
Eloise Barnes as Ella: Sam's younger sister.
Phyllida Law as Gran: Sam's grandmother.
Greta Scacchi as Mrs. Willis: Both Sam and Felix's tutor, who likes to teach "fun stuff".
Natalia Tena as Annie: A nurse who rides around on a pink scooter and calls herself "Dracula", on account that she often takes kids' blood samples.
Ella Purnell as Kaleigh: Felix's cousin, who helps Sam and Felix into her uncle's pub for a drink and a kiss.

Production 

Ways to Live Forever was filmed in studio and on location in and around Newcastle upon Tyne: Eldon Square, Tynemouth, North Shields, Cullercoats, and Whitley Bay.

References

External links 
 
 

2010 films
Spanish drama films
English-language Spanish films
Films based on British novels
2010 drama films
British drama films
Films about cancer
Films set in Newcastle upon Tyne
Films scored by César Benito
2010s English-language films
2010s British films
2010s Spanish films